Alexandre-Joseph Le Roy de Bacre, born in Paris, was a 19th-century French playwright.

Biography 
He first made a career in the army as an officer before devoting himself to theater. He attended the military school in Ventimiglia and served as a lieutenant during the campaigns of 1792-1793 and was Dumouriez's aide-de-camp, following him during his flight to Austria. He then served Austria before returning to France where he was reincorporated in the regiment of the reigning prince of Isenburg and became his aide-de-camp.

He then served in the Napoleonic armies and participated to the last campaigns as assistant captain of the General Staff.

His plays were presented on the most important Parisian stages of the 19th century: Théâtre de la Porte-Saint-Martin, Théâtre de la Gaité, Théâtre du Vaudeville, etc.

Works 
1795: Le Passage du Waal ou les Amants républicains, opéra comique
1801: La Femme romanesque, comedy in 1 act and in prose
1806: Caroline et Dorville ou la Bataille dans les dunes, melodrama in 3 acts, with Louis de Moranges
1816: Malhek-Adhel, drama in 3 acts
1820: Monsieur David, comédie anecdotique in 1 act and in prose, with Alexandre Martin
1821: Isabelle de Levanzo, ou la Fille écuyer, melodrama in 3 acts and great extravaganza, with René Perin
1822: Le Protégé de tout le monde, comédie en vaudevilles en 1 act, with Aimé Desprez and Joseph-François-Nicolas Dusaulchoy de Bergemont
1824: Les Hussards, ou le Maréchal des logis piémontais, mimodrama in 2 acts, extravaganza
1825: Le Vieillard ou la Révélation, melodrama in 2 acts, with Henri Franconi
1826: La Famille Girard, ou les Prisonniers français, tableau militaire anecdote in 1 act, with Armand Séville
1826: Joseph II ou l'Inconnu au cabaret, comédie-vaudeville, with Félix-Auguste Duvert and W. Lafontaine
1828: La Prison de village, comedy in 1 act, with Frédéric de Courcy
1829: Le Panier d'argenterie, mélodrame anecdotique in 3 acts, from Nouvelles by Merville
1833: Le Fils naturel, ou l'Insulte, drama in 3 acts

Bibliography 
 A. Jay, Antoine-Vincent Arnault, E. Jouy, Biographie nouvelle des contemporains, 1823, (p. 399) 
 Joseph-Marie Quérard, La France littéraire, 1833, (p. 223)
 

19th-century French dramatists and playwrights
Writers from Paris
French soldiers